The John B. McFerrin House is a historic house in Collierville, Tennessee, United States. It was built in 1923 for John B. McFerrin, a wholesaler. It remained in the McFerrin family until 1941, when it was sold to Ronald B. Smith, Sr. It has been listed on the National Register of Historic Places since March 29, 1991.

References

Houses on the National Register of Historic Places in Tennessee
Colonial Revival architecture in Tennessee
Houses completed in 1923
Houses in Shelby County, Tennessee